Namacodon schinzianum is a species of plant in the family Campanulaceae, endemic to Namibia. It was originally described by Friedrich Markgraf in 1941 as Prismatocarpus schinzianus, but was moved to its own genus, Namacodon by Mats Thulin in 1974. It is known from fewer than 20 populations, all among rocks at  altitude.

References

Campanuloideae
Monotypic Campanulaceae genera
Endemic flora of Namibia
Least concern plants
Taxonomy articles created by Polbot